The Dudley Award, named after former Virginia running back Bill Dudley, is presented annually by the Richmond Times-Dispatch to honor the top NCAA football player in the Commonwealth of Virginia.

References

College football regional and state awards
Awards established in 1990
American football in Virginia